Anzhelina Alekseevna Shvachka (born 1971) is a Ukrainian operatic mezzo-soprano singer. She is a leading soloist of the National Opera of Ukraine in Kyiv, where she started in 1997.

Career

Shvachka was born in Dnipro, Ukraine. She is the prizewinner of Klaudia Taev Competition in 2005. After that she was invited to perform numerous times with Pärnu International Opera Music Festival PromFest in Estonia and abroad. Some notable roles were the title role in Carmen (2007), Lyubasha in The Tsar's Bride (2013), Amneris in Aida (2015).

She recorded Prince Igor with the NRCU Symphony Orchestra under Theodore Kuchar in 2005, and Robert Ian Winstin's Oedipus Requiem with the Kyiv Philharmonic in 2007.

Awards
Taras Shevchenko National Prize of Ukraine (2016)

Notes and references
Notes

References

External links

Profile, Stretta Artists Management

1971 births
Living people
Musicians from Dnipro
Operatic mezzo-sopranos
21st-century Ukrainian women opera singers
Kyiv Conservatory alumni
Recipients of the Shevchenko National Prize
Recipients of the title of People's Artists of Ukraine